KCFO (970 AM) is a Tulsa, Oklahoma, area Christian radio station. KCFO airs national shows such as Dave Ramsey, J. Vernon McGee, David Jeremiah, Dennis Rainey, and Albert Mohler.

The station has been assigned the KCFO call letters by the Federal Communications Commission since October 21, 1984.

History

Beginnings on 1570
KAKC 970 first signed on the air on December 24, 1946; it was founded by Sam Avey. Avey was a local businessman and sports promoter, who owned the Tulsa Coliseum. When KAKC first went on the air, it was a day-time only station, called "The Hometown Station," with a focus on serving the Tulsa community, broadcasting local sports, local news, and some music. It began at 1570 on the AM dial. In April 1948, the station got permission to move to 970 AM, and it also received permission to broadcast in the evenings as well as during the day.

The Top 40 era
In the mid-1950s, the station got new ownership and hired Vic Lundberg and Greg Chancellor as announcers. From the late 1950s to the mid-1970s, KAKC 970 AM was a Top 40 station in Tulsa, Oklahoma. Known first as "The Big 97" and later "The Rockin' 97", the station was owned (along with KAKC-FM 92.9) by S. Carl Mark. Both stations used consultant Bill Drake for their programming, with KAKC (AM) being the dominant music station for many years until the mid-1970s when long-time Top 40 competitor KELI (now known as KTBZ) and FM upstart KTFX "The Superfox 103" (now KJSR "Star 103.3") cut into their audience.

Simulcast on FM
KAKC-FM 92.9 FM in the 1970s used a Drake-Chenault programmed automated oldies format during the day. From 6 p.m. to midnight, the FM simulcasted with KAKC 970 to make up for the AM's weak 250-watt nighttime signal. In the summer of 1977 KAKC-FM flipped to the then-popular "Beautiful Music" format and changed the call letters to KBEZ-FM.

Adult standards & gospel (1979-1984)
In January 1979, KAKC shocked the Tulsa radio market by dropping Top 40 programming after 21 years for adult standards, with rapidly declining ratings as the result. A year later the station was purchased by the owners of KCFO-FM (now KVOO-FM) which changed the format to Southern Gospel music and Christian talk programming. In 1984 the legendary 970 call letters were changed to KCFO.

References

External links
 KCFO station website

CFO
Radio stations established in 1946
1946 establishments in Oklahoma
CFO